Edwin Howard may refer to:

 Ted Howard (politician) (Edwin John Howard, 1868–1939), New Zealand politician
 Edwin Howard (architect) (1896-1982), American architect
 Edwin Alfred Howard (1922–1942), United States Marine awarded the Silver Star
 Edwin B. Howard (1901–1993), American general